Oleksandr Dzhaburiya (born 25 September 1972) is a Ukrainian swimmer. He competed in two events at the 1996 Summer Olympics.

References

1972 births
Living people
Ukrainian male swimmers
Olympic swimmers of Ukraine
Swimmers at the 1996 Summer Olympics
Place of birth missing (living people)